Umra is a village in Rahi block of Rae Bareli district, Uttar Pradesh, India. It is located 9 km from Rae Bareli, the district headquarters. As of 2011, it has a population of 1,916 people, in 344 households. It has one primary school and no healthcare facilities.

The 1961 census recorded Umra as comprising 2 hamlets, with a total population of 503 people (250 male and 253 female), in 96 households and 91 physical houses. The area of the village was given as 632 acres and it had a post office at that point.

The 1981 census recorded Umra as having a population of 811 people, in 192 households, and having an area of 251.32 hectares. The main staple foods were given as wheat and rice.

References

Villages in Raebareli district